"Easy to Love" is the title of a R&B single by For Real, it was the second single from their debut album It's a Natural Thang. Billboard magazine noted "super-tight harmonies that are prominent, but not overshadowing; instantly memorable melody stands as the cut's focal point.

Tracklisting
Maxi-Promo CD & 12" Vinyl
1.) Easy To Love (LP Edit) [4:11]
2.) Easy To Love (Silky Soul 7") [4:18]
3.) Easy To Love (Da Eazy Urban Remix Radio) [3:56]
4.) Easy To Love (Jason Remix) [4:21]
5.) Easy To Love (In Da Soul Old Skool Radio) [3:58]

Chart positions

References

1994 singles
1993 songs
For Real songs
A&M Records singles